Igor Stojaković (Serbian Cyrillic: Игор Стојаковић; born 27 May 1980) is a retired Serbian professional footballer.

Honours
Mogren
 Montenegrin First League: 2008–09

Vardar
 Macedonian First Football League: 2011–12

References

External links
 UEFA profile
 Srbijafudbal profile
 

Association football midfielders
Expatriate footballers in Montenegro
Expatriate footballers in Sweden
Expatriate footballers in North Macedonia
FK Banat Zrenjanin players
FK Budućnost Banatski Dvor players
FK Čukarički players
FK Javor Ivanjica players
FK Mogren players
FK Rad players
FK Vardar players
Montenegrin First League players
Sportspeople from Kraljevo
Serbia and Montenegro under-21 international footballers
Serbian expatriate footballers
Serbian expatriate sportspeople in Montenegro
Serbian expatriate sportspeople in Sweden
Serbian expatriate sportspeople in North Macedonia
Serbian footballers
Serbian First League players
Serbian SuperLiga players
Vasalunds IF players
1980 births
Living people